Tteok Museum is a museum located in Waryong-dong, Jongno-gu, Seoul, South Korea. Founded by Yoon Sookja, the chief director of the Institute of Traditional Korean Food (한국전통음식연구소), it opened in December, 2002. The museum specializes in Korean cutlery with approximately 2,000 old Korean kitchen utensils from ancient maetdol (맷돌, grinding stones) to early 20th century kitchenwares on display and exhibits 50 of Korea's nearly 200 types of tteok (Korean rice cake).

See also
Tteok
Korean cuisine
Kimchi Field Museum
Korean Folk Village
List of museums in Seoul
 List of food and beverage museums

References

External links
 

Jongno District
Museums in Seoul
Korean cuisine
Tteok
Museums established in 2002
Food and drink museums
2002 establishments in South Korea